Sobíňov is a municipality and village in Havlíčkův Brod District in the Vysočina Region of the Czech Republic. It has about 700 inhabitants.

Geography
It lies in the Upper Sázava Hills. The Doubrava River flows through the municipality. The area on the left bank of the river is protected as a nature reserve.

History
A trade route in the area of Sobíňov is documented already in 1144. The first written mention of Sobíňov is from 1358, when a fortress was built here. At the end of the 14th century, it was administratively joined to the Kunštát estate. In the 16th century, it was owned by the noble Trčka of Lípa family, then it was joined to the Polná estate.

Transport

Sobíňov has a railway halt on the Pardubice–Havlíčkův Brod railroad of local importance.

Sights
Sobíňov is known for a pilgrimage site called Sopoty with the Church of the Visitation of the Virgin Mary. The church was built in the Baroque style in 1749–1752.

References

External links

Villages in Havlíčkův Brod District